Flight calls are vocalisations made by birds in flight, often serving to keep flocks together.

References

Bird sounds